is an ancient Japanese given name for men. The name originally came from the word  which is the right guardhouse of the gates of Heian-kyō imperial palace during the Asuka period and Heian period.

In addition to hiragana and katakana, Iemon can be written using different kanji characters ( or ).

People
Iemon (伊右衛門 or 猪右衛門), an alternate name of Yamauchi Kazutoyo

Fictional characters

Tamiya Iemon (伊右衛門), a main character in Yotsuya Kaidan, a ghost story
The main character in Crest of Betrayal, a 1994 Japanese film adaptation of Yotsuya Kaidan
A main character in Ayakashi: Samurai Horror Tales, an animated horror anthology television series featuring an adaptation of Yotsuya Kaidan
Iemon, a minor character who appears in the video game and subsequent anime series Tales of the Abyss

Other uses
Iemon (伊右衛門), a brand of green tea drink released by Suntory and tea company Fukujyuen
Yemon (イエモン), an abbreviation of the Japanese rock band The Yellow Monkey

Japanese masculine given names